Eugene Bondurant Sledge (November 4, 1923 – March 3, 2001) was a United States Marine, university professor, and author.  His 1981 memoir With the Old Breed: At Peleliu and Okinawa chronicled his combat experiences during World War II and was used as source material for the Ken Burns PBS documentary The War (2007), as well as the HBO miniseries The Pacific (2010), in which he is portrayed by Joseph Mazzello.

Biography

Early life
Eugene Bondurant Sledge was born on November 4, 1923, in Mobile, Alabama, to Edward Simmons Sledge, a physician, and Mary Frank Sturdivant Sledge, dean of women students at Huntingdon College. He graduated from Murphy High School in Mobile in the spring of 1942. His older brother, Edward Simmons Sledge II, was born on September 10, 1920, and enlisted in the United States Army. He went on to serve in the Western European theater, left the Army with the rank of Major and died on September 23, 1985.

Eugene was a sickly child and lost two years of schooling due to rheumatic fever and this condition left him with a heart murmur. However once the condition subsided, his family encouraged him to enroll in college rather than join the military. His close childhood friend Sidney Phillips also wrote to Sledge from Guadalcanal and urged him to not join anything.

Military career
In the fall of 1942, Sledge enrolled in the Marion Military Institute, in Marion, Alabama, but then he chose to volunteer for the U.S. Marine Corps in December 1942. He was placed in the V-12 officer training program and was sent to the Georgia Institute of Technology, where he and half of his detachment "flunked out" so they would be allowed to serve their time as enlistees and not "miss the war".

Once he was out of school, he was assigned duty as an enlisted man in K Company, 3rd Battalion, 5th Marines, 1st Marine Division (K/3/5), where he served with Corporal R.V. Burgin and Private First Class Merriell "Snafu" Shelton. He rose to the rank of corporal in the Pacific Theater and saw combat as a 60 mm mortarman at Peleliu and Okinawa. When fighting grew too close for effective use of the mortar, he served in other duties such as stretcher bearer and as a rifleman.

During his service, Sledge kept notes of what happened in his pocket-sized New Testament. When the war ended, he compiled these notes which would, many years later, become the  memoir With the Old Breed. After being posted to Beijing after the war, he was discharged from the Marine Corps in February 1946 with the rank of corporal.

Post-war
After the war ended, Sledge attended Auburn University (then known as Alabama Polytechnic Institute), where he was a member of the Phi Delta Theta fraternity. He received a Bachelor of Science degree in business administration in the summer of 1949.

Sledge had a hard time readjusting to civilian life:

As I strolled the streets of Mobile, civilian life seemed so strange. People rushed around in a hurry about seemingly insignificant things. Few seemed to realize how blessed they were to be free and untouched by the horrors of war. To them, a veteran was a veteran—all were the same, whether one man had survived the deadliest combat or another had pounded a typewriter while in uniform.

Once an avid hunter, Sledge gave up his hobby. He found that he could not endure the thought of wounding a bird and said that killing a deer felt like shooting a cow in a pasture. His father found him weeping after a dove hunt in which Sledge had to kill a wounded dove, and in the ensuing conversations he told his father he could no longer tolerate seeing any suffering. A key turning point in his life and career followed when his father advised him that he could substitute bird watching as a hobby. Sledge started to assist the conservation department in its banding study efforts, the origin of his well-known passion for the science of ornithology.

When he enrolled at Auburn University, the clerk at the Registrar's office asked him if the Marine Corps had taught him anything useful. Sledge replied:

Lady, there was a killing war. The Marine Corps taught me how to kill Japs and try to survive. Now, if that don't fit into any academic course, I'm sorry. But some of us had to do the killing—and most of my buddies got killed or wounded.

Sledge married Jeanne Arceneaux in 1952 and the couple had two sons, John (born 1957) and Henry (born 1965). He returned to Auburn in 1953, where he worked as a research assistant until 1955. That same year he graduated from API with a Master of Science degree in botany.

Doctorate and later work
From 1956 to 1960, Sledge attended the University of Florida and worked as a research assistant. He published numerous papers on helminthology and in 1956 joined the Helminthological Society of Washington. He received his doctorate in biology from the University of Florida in 1960. He was employed by the Division of Plant Industry for the Florida State Department of Agriculture from 1959 to 1962.

In the summer of 1962, Sledge was appointed assistant professor of biology at Alabama College (now the University of Montevallo). In 1970, he became a professor, a position he held until his retirement in 1990. He taught zoology, ornithology, comparative vertebrate anatomy, and other courses during his long tenure there. Sledge was popular with his students, and organized field trips and collections around town. In 1989, he received an honorary degree and rank of colonel from Marion Military Institute.

Death
Sledge died after a long battle with stomach cancer on March 3, 2001.

Bibliography

With the Old Breed

At the urging of his wife, Sledge began to compile a memoir of his war experiences as a way to better help him cope. In 1981, he published With the Old Breed: At Peleliu and Okinawa, a memoir of his World War II service with the United States Marine Corps. With the Old Breed was reprinted in 1990 (with an introduction by Paul Fussell) and again in 2007 (with an introduction by Victor Davis Hanson). In 1992, Sledge was featured in the documentary film Peleliu 1944: Horror in the Pacific. In April 2007, it was announced that With the Old Breed, along with Robert Leckie's Helmet for My Pillow, would form the basis for the HBO series The Pacific.

China Marine

A second memoir, China Marine: An Infantryman's Life after World War II, was published posthumously. Its initial hardbound edition, with a foreword by Stephen E. Ambrose, was published without a subtitle on May 10, 2002, by the University of Alabama Press. In 2003, Oxford University Press republished it as a paperback edition with the full title, including the subtitle. The book discussed his postwar service in Peking (now known as Beijing), his return to Mobile, and his recovery from the psychological trauma of warfare.

Awards and decorations
Sledge was entitled to campaign participation credit ("battle stars") for Capture and Occupation of the Southern Palau Islands (Peleliu), and Assault and Occupation of Okinawa Gunto.

His decorations and medals include:

See also

 List of U.S. Marines
 List of non-fiction writers
 List of people from Alabama
 Lists of writers
 Sidney Phillips
 Romus Burgin
 Merriell Shelton

References

External links

1923 births
2001 deaths
American biologists
United States Marine Corps personnel of World War II
20th-century American memoirists
Auburn University alumni
Burials in Alabama
Deaths from cancer in Alabama
Deaths from stomach cancer
Marion Military Institute alumni
Military personnel from Mobile, Alabama
United States Marine Corps non-commissioned officers
University of Florida alumni
University of Montevallo faculty
Writers from Mobile, Alabama
20th-century biologists